Disks large-associated protein 1 (DAP-1), also known as guanylate kinase-associated protein (GKAP), is a protein that in humans is encoded by the DLGAP1 gene. DAP-1 is known to be highly enriched in synaptosomal preparations of the brain, and present in the post-synaptic density.

Function 

This gene encodes the protein called guanylate kinase-associated protein (GKAP).  GKAP binds to the SHANK and PSD-95 proteins, facilitating the assembly of the post-synaptic density of neurons. Dlgap1 has five 14-amino-acid repeats and three Pro-rich portions.

Interactions 

DLGAP1 has been shown to interact with:
 DLG1 
 DLG4 
 DYNLL1
 DYNLL2
 SHANK2

The interaction with PSD95 and S-SCAM is mediated by the GUK domain and it has been hypothesized that this might mean it can also interact with other GUK containing proteins.

References

Further reading

Proteins